This is a list of valleys of Nevada. Valleys are ordered alphabetically, by county. Dramatic parallelism is shown in the landforms of central and eastern Nevada. The most common valley name is Antelope Valley which is used for 5 different areas in Douglas, Elko/White Pine, Eureka, Lander, and Washoe Counties.

Churchill County

 Carson Sink
 Copper Valley (Churchill-Pershing Counties)
 Dixie Valley (Churchill-Pershing Counties)
 Edwards Creek Valley
 Fairview Valley
 Granite Springs Valley (Churchill-Pershing Counties)
 Lahontan Valley
 North Valley
 Stingaree Valley
 Wyemaha Valley

Clark County

 Bitter Spring Valley
 Cottonwood Valley
 Cottonwood Valley (Mojave Co., Arizona/Clark Co., Nevada)
 Dry Lake Valley
 Eldorado Valley
 Goodsprings Valley
 Green Valley
 Hidden Valley
 Indian Springs Valley (Nevada) (Clark-Lincoln Counties)
 Ivanpah Valley
 Las Vegas Valley
 Mercury Valley
 Moapa Valley
 Pahrump Valley (Clark-Nye Counties)
 Paradise Valley (Clark County)
 Pinto Valley
 Piute Valley
 Spring Valley
 Three Lakes Valley (Clark-Lincoln Counties)
 Virgin Valley

Douglas County

 Antelope Valley (Douglas County)
 Carson Valley
 Heavenly Valley North
 Jacks Valley
 Mineral Valley

Elko County

 Antelope Valley (Elko-White Pine Counties)
 Butte Valley (Elko County)
 Clover Valley (Nevada)
 Duck Valley
 Goshute Valley
 Huntington Valley (Elko-White Pine Counties)
 Independence Valley (northwestern Elko County, Nevada)
 Independence Valley (eastern Elko County, Nevada)
 Lamoille Valley
 Pilot Creek Valley, (w Leppy Reservoir,(east, into Utah))
 Ruby Valley (Elko-White Pine Counties)
 Squaw Valley (Nevada)
 Starr Valley
 Steptoe Valley (Elko-White Pine Counties)
 Tecoma Valley (Nevada-Utah)
 Thousand Springs Valley

Esmeralda County

 Big Smoky Valley (Esmeralda-Lander-Nye Counties)
 Cirac Valley
 Clayton Valley, (at Silver Peak, Nevada)
 Fish Lake Valley
 Lida Valley
 Monte Cristo Valley (Esmeralda-Mineral Counties)
 Montezuma Valley

Eureka County

 Antelope Valley (Eureka County)
 Boulder Valley, (at Dunphy, Nevada)
 Crescent Valley
 Denay Valley
 Diamond Valley
 Fish Creek Valley (Eureka-White Pine Counties)
 Garden Valley (Eureka County)
 Grass Valley (Lander-Eureka Counties)
 Kobeh Valley
 Little Smoky Valley (Eureka-Nye-White Pine Counties)
 Pine Valley (Nevada), (at Cortez Mountains
 Horse Creek Valley

Humboldt County

 Bog Hot Valley
 Buffalo Valley (Humboldt-Lander-Pershing Counties)
 Desert Valley (Humboldt County)
 Eden Valley
 Grass Valley (Humboldt-Pershing Counties)
 Hualapai Flat
 Kings River Valley
 Paradise Valley (Humboldt County)
 Pueblo Valley
 Pumpernickel Valley
 Quinn River Valley
 Silver State Valley

Lander County

 Antelope Valley (Lander County)
 Big Smoky Valley (Esmeralda-Lander-Nye Counties)
 Boulder Valley, (at Dunphy, Nevada) (Eureka-Lander Counties)
 Buffalo Valley (Humboldt-Lander-Pershing Counties)
 Carico Lake Valley
 Crescent Valley (Eureka-Lander Counties)
 Grass Valley (Eureka-Lander Counties)
 Monitor Valley (Lander-Nye Counties)
 Reese River Valley (Lander-Nye Counties)
 Smith Creek Valley

Lincoln County 

 Cave Valley (Nevada)
 Coal Valley
 Coyote Springs Valley
 Delamar Valley
 Desert Valley (Lincoln County)
 Dry Valley (Lincoln County)
 Dry Lake Valley
 Emigrant Valley
 Garden Valley
 Hamlin Valley
 Indian Springs Valley (Nevada) (Clark-Lincoln Counties)
 Kane Springs Valley
 Lake Valley (Nevada)
 Meadow Valley, (at Indian Cove, Nevada)
 Muleshoe Valley
 Pahranagat Valley
 Sand Spring Valley
 Spring Valley (White Pine County, Nevada) (White Pine-Lincoln Counties)
 Three Lakes Valley (Clark-Lincoln Counties)
 Tikaboo Valley
 Tule Desert (Nevada), (at Tule Springs Hills, Clover Mountains)
 White River Valley (Lincoln-Nye-White Pine Counties)

Lyon County

 Adrian Valley
 Campbell Valley (Lyon-Mineral County)
 Churchill Valley
 Mason Valley
 Smith Valley (Lyon County)

Mineral County

 Alkali Valley
 Aurora Valley
 Campbell Valley (Lyon-Mineral County)
 Gabbs Valley (Mineral-Nye Counties)
 Huntoon Valley
 Long Valley (Mineral County)
 Monte Cristo Valley (Esmeralda-Mineral Counties)
 Soda Springs Valley, (Luning, NV, Tonopah Junction, NV)
 Stewart Valley (Nevada)
 Queen Valley
 Walker Lake Valley
 Walker River Valley
 Win Wan Valley

Nye County

 Amargosa Valley, Amargosa Valley, NV
 Big Sand Springs Valley
 Big Smoky Valley (Esmeralda-Lander-Nye Counties)
 Cactus Flat
 Coal Valley (Lincoln-Nye Counties)
 Duckwater Valley
 East Stone Cabin Valley
 Emigrant Valley
 Gabbs Valley (Mineral-Nye Counties)
 Garden Valley (Lincoln-Nye County)
 Hot Creek Valley
 Ione Valley
 Ivanpah Valley
 Kawich Valley
 Little Fish Lake Valley
 Little Smoky Valley (Eureka-Nye-White Pine Counties)
 Lodi Valley
 Mercury Valley
 Mid Valley
 Monitor Valley (Lander-Nye Counties)
 Monotony Valley
 Oasis Valley, (at Beatty, Nevada)
 Pahrump Valley (Clark-Nye Counties)
 Railroad Valley (Nye-White Pine Counties)
 Ralston Valley
 Reese River Valley (Lander-Nye Counties)
 Reveille Valley
 Rock Valley
 Sand Springs Valley
 Stewart Valley
 Stone Cabin Valley
 West Stone Cabin Valley
 White River Valley (Lincoln-Nye-White Pine Counties)

Pershing County

 Buena Vista Valley
 Buffalo Valley (Lander-Humboldt-Pershing Counties)
 Desert Valley (Humboldt-Pershing Counties)
 Granite Springs Valley (Churchill-Pershing Counties)
 Grass Valley (Humboldt-Pershing Counties)
 Hualapai Flat
 Jersey Valley
 Kurniva Valley
 Lower Valley (Churchill-Pershing Counties)
 Pleasant Valley (Pershing County)
 Poito Valley
 Sage Valley
 Sage Hen Valley
 Upper Valley

Washoe County

 Antelope Valley (Washoe County)
 Cold Springs Valley
 Dry Valley (Washoe County)
 Golden Valley
 Guano Valley
 Honey Lake Valley
 Hungry Valley
 Hualapai Flat
 Lemmon Valley
 Long Valley (Washoe County)
 Mosquito Valley
 Spanish Springs Valley
 Sun Valley
 Winnemucca Valley
 Washoe Valley (Nevada)

White Pine County

 Antelope Valley (Elko-White Pine Counties)
 Butte Valley (White Pine County)
 Duck Creek Valley
 Huntington Valley (Elko-White Pine Counties)
 Jakes Valley
 Little Smoky Valley
 Long Valley (White Pine County)
 Newark Valley (Nevada)
 Pleasant Valley (White Pine County), (at Kern Mountains)
 Railroad Valley (Nye-White Pine Counties)
 Ruby Valley (Elko-White Pine Counties)
 Smith Valley (White Pine County)
 Snake Valley
 Spring Valley (White Pine County, Nevada)
 Steptoe Valley (Elko-White Pine Counties)
 White River Valley (Lincoln-Nye-White Pine Counties)

See also
List of mountain ranges of Nevada

References

 Benchmark Maps. Nevada Road & Recreation Atlas. Benchmark Maps, c. 2010, 96 pp.
 DeLorme. Nevada Atlas & Gazetteer, DeLorme, c. 2010, 72 pp.

 
Nevada
Valleys